In Modern English, we is a plural, first-person pronoun

Morphology  
In Standard Modern English, we has six distinct shapes for five word forms:

 we: the nominative (subjective) form
 us and : the accusative (objective; also called the 'oblique'.) form
 our: the dependent genitive (possessive) form
ours: the independent genitive (possessive) form
 ourselves: the reflexive form
There is also a distinct determiner we as in we humans aren't perfect, which some people consider to be just an extended use of the pronoun.

History
We has been part of English since Old English, having come from Proto-Germanic *wejes, from PIE *we-. Similarly, us was used in Old English as the accusative and dative plural of we, from PIE *nes-. The following table shows the old English first-person plural and dual pronouns:

By late Middle English the dual form was lost and the dative and accusative had merged. The ours genitive can be seen as early as the 12th century. Ourselves replaced original construction we selfe, us selfum in the 15th century, so that, by century's end, the Middle English forms of we had solidified into those we use today.

Gender 
We is not generally seen as participating in the system of gender. In Old English, it certainly didn't. Only third-person pronouns had distinct masculine, feminine, and neutre gender forms. But by the 17th century, that old gender system, which also marked gender on common nouns and adjectives, had disappeared, leaving only pronoun marking. At the same time, a new relative pronoun system was developing that eventually split between personal relative who and impersonal relative which. This is seen as a new personal / non-personal (or impersonal) gender system. As a result,

Syntax

Functions 
We can appear as a subject, object, determiner or predicative complement. The reflexive form also appears as an adjunct.

 Subject: We're there; us being there; our being there; we planned for ourselves to be there.
 Object: They saw us; She pointed them to us; We though about ourselves.
 Predicative complement: They have become us; We eventually felt we had become ourselves.
 Dependent determiner: We reached our goals; We humans aren't perfect; Give it to us students.
 Independent determiner: This is ours.
 Adjunct: We did it ourselves.

The contracted object form  is only possible after the special let of let's do that.

Dependents 
Pronouns rarely take dependents, but it is possible for we to have many of the same kind of dependents as other noun phrases.

 Relative clause modifier: we who arrived late
 Determiner: Not a lot of people know the real us.
 Adjective phrase modifier: Not a lot of people know the real us.
 Adverb phrase external modifier: not even us

Semantics 
We referents generally must include the speaker, along with other persons. A few exceptional cases, which include nosism, are presented below. We is always definite and specific.

Royal we 

The royal we, or majestic plural (pluralis majestatis), is sometimes used by a person of high office, such as a monarch, earl, or pope. It has singular semantics.

Editorial we 
The editorial we is a similar phenomenon, in which an editorial columnist in a newspaper or a similar commentator in another medium refers to themselves as we when giving their opinion. Here, the writer casts themselves in the role of spokesperson: either for the media institution who employs them, or on behalf of the party or body of citizens who agree with the commentary. The reference is not explicit, but is generally consistent with first-person plural.

Author's we 
The author's we, or pluralis modestiae, is a practice referring to a generic third person as we (instead of one or the informal you):
By adding four and five, we obtain nine.
We are therefore led also to a definition of "time" in physics. — Albert Einstein

We in this sense often refers to "the reader and the author" because the author often assumes that the reader knows and agrees with certain principles or previous theorems for the sake of brevity (or, if not, the reader is prompted to look them up). This practice is discouraged by some academic style guides because it fails to distinguish between sole authorship and co-authorship. Again, the reference is not explicit, but is generally consistent with first-person plural.

Inclusive and exclusive we 

Some languages distinguish between inclusive we, which includes both the speaker and the addressee(s), and exclusive we, which excludes the addressee(s). English does not make this distinction grammatically, though we can have both inclusive and exclusive semantics.

Imperative let's or let us allows imperatives to be inclusive. Compare:

 Take this outside. (exclusive, 2nd person)
 Let's take this outside. (inclusive, 1st person)

Second-person we 
We is used sometimes in place of you to address a second party: A doctor may ask a patient: "And how are we feeling today?". A waiter may ask a client: "What are we in the mood for?"

Membership we 
The membership we is a simultaneous reference to the individual, and to the collective of which the individual is a member. If ants or hive bees could use English, they might use the pronoun we almost exclusively. Human cultures can be categorized as communal or individualist; the membership we aligns more with a communal culture. The speaker, or thinker, expresses ideas with awareness of both themselves and the collective of other members. If language constrains or liberates thinking, then using the membership we may impact our ability to understand, empathize, and bond with others. The extent of inclusion when using the membership we is loosely definite; the group may be others of the same village, nation, species, or planet. The following two examples show how meaning changes subtly depending on whether I or we is used. When using the membership we, the reader or speaker is automatically drawn into the collective, and the change in viewpoint is significant:
If I consume too much, I will run out of resources.  If we consume too much, we will run out of resources.
The more I learn, the more I should question.  The more we learn, the more we should question.

Pronunciation 
According to the OED, the following pronunciations are used:

References

Middle English personal pronouns
Modern English personal pronouns
Old English personal pronouns